Garth Fisher (born September 1, 1958), is an American plastic surgeon best known as the first doctor selected for the ABC television show Extreme Makeover. Fisher's clientele includes entertainers, celebrities and business executives and he specializes in aesthetic/cosmetic plastic surgery of the face, nose, breast and other parts of the body.

Personal life
He was married to Jessica Canseco; and before that he was married to model/TV hostess Brooke Burke, with whom he has two daughters who are raised in their mother's Jewish faith.

Education and career
Fisher graduated from University of Mississippi with a BA in 1980 and an MD in 1984 and completed his internship, general surgery residency and plastic surgery residency at the University of California, Irvine. Based in Beverly Hills, California, he is best known as the plastic surgeon on ABC's Extreme Makeover television series. 

Fisher has been selected as "one of the top plastic surgeons in the United States for facial cosmetic and breast surgery" in Best Doctors in America, an authoritative listing of the nation's most prominent physicians in each medical specialty. He has also been listed annually in the Castle Connolly directory of America's Foremost Surgeons, an honor bestowed on less than 1% of the country's physicians. His recognition as a top surgeon and his exposure from Extreme Makeover have led to a number of media appearances for Fisher.

Fisher also has an appreciation of the value of developing and sustaining well nourished skin, which led him to work on a line of skin care products. In 2006, Fisher partnered with Paul Scott Premo to found CellCeuticals Skin Care, Inc., a company that aims to develop effective and safe skin treatment products based on scientifically controlled studies.

In 2014, Fisher was knighted Sir Garth Fisher in honor of his contributions and achievements in the field of plastic surgery.

Press appearances
Fisher has been interviewed or written about by a number of magazines, including People, FHM, Vanity Fair, The Hollywood Reporter, Elle, Oxygen, The Peninsula, OK! Magazine, Twenty One, Beverly Hills Times and Beyond Beauty.

Fisher has also appeared on television and radio shows including Nightline, The Insider, Inside Edition, Harry Loves Lisa, Holly's World, Katie & Peter: The Next Chapter, KTLA, Kendra, Keeping Up with the Kardashians, Extra, The Wayne Brady Show, Access Hollywood, E! Entertainment Radio, Fox Radio, Premiere Radio and KROQ in Los Angeles.

References

External links

 Garth Fisher Website

American plastic surgeons
Living people
1958 births
University of Mississippi alumni
University of California alumni
Physicians from Mississippi
Television personalities from Los Angeles
People from Beverly Hills, California
Physicians from California